Hélène Lê Thị Liên, popularly known as Ái Liên (Hải Phòng 1918/1920-1991) was a Vietnamese cải lương actress and female singer. She is the mother of singer Ái Vân. Around 1938, she recorded 18 songs on 78 rpms with Kim Thoa, then again with Năm Châu.

References

20th-century Vietnamese women singers
20th-century births
1991 deaths